Elections to Brentwood Borough Council were held on 10 June 2004.  One third of the council was up for election, all seats last being elected in 2002 following boundary changes.  The Conservative Party took control of the council.

After the election, the composition of the council was
 Conservative 21
 Liberal Democrat 13
 Labour 3

Election result

The swing was 4.9% from the Liberal Democrats to the Conservatives.

Ward results

Composition of expiring seats before election

External links 
 Brentwood Council

2004
2004 English local elections
2000s in Essex